Richard David Conroy Evans (born 7 September 1953) is an  Australian writer and a former federal politician, peak industry body executive, and business and leadership consultant.

Evans is an author in the emerging genre of Australian political and parliamentary thriller, with his first fiction novel – Deceit – published in July 2018.

Evans served as a Liberal Party of Australia member in the Australian House of Representatives.  He was the member for Cowan from 1993 to 1998.

From the late 1970s, Evans forged a successful career as a corporate executive and has led several national industry associations. He has served as the CEO of the Franchise Council of Australia, Executive Director of the Australian Retailers Association, Executive Director of Clubs Victoria and the Council of Textile and Fashion Industries Australia.

In 2005 he graduated Bachelor of Arts and in 2012 graduated Masters of Creative Writing.

Early life 
Evans, the second of two sons, was born in Melbourne, Victoria, to Rena (née Haworth) and Robert Evans.

Robert Evans (21 October 1926 – 30 May 1996) served in the Australian Air Force during World War 2, and worked as an upholsterer for the government railways, an experimental trimmer for Volkswagen, and a planning technician for Olympic Tyres. Robert Evans was the Victorian Commissioner for Scouts and contributed significantly to that organisation in a variety of leadership roles.

Rena Evans (17 March 1926 – 8 August 2014) was a retailer and chef's executive manager at the Victorian Royal Melbourne Hospital.

Richard Evans grew up in Williamstown, Victoria; attended the local primary and secondary schools, leaving school at 16 years of age. Evans started working in various retail outlets, pumped petrol and delivered pharmacy prescriptions when still at school. At 16, Evans took a job as an apprentice within the printing industry, working in newspapers and graphic arts. Soon after completing his four-year apprenticeship, he moved into the hospitality industry and was promoted to management roles with Lazars and at the Melbourne Hilton.

As a teenager and young adult, he was a skilled sportsman and won many events and tournaments in track and field athletics and badminton.  He played semi-professional Australian Rules football for the Williamstown Football Club, playing in a premiership with the Thirds in 1971 and playing 5 senior games, kicking one goal, in 1975 and 1976, before moving to Western Australia as a senior player for the Subiaco Football Club.

Business career 
Evans moved to Perth, Western Australia in 1976 to play Australian Rules Football and was employed in media management. He was appointed Advertising Manager with Wesfarmers’ newspaper, Western Farmer and Grazier at 26 years of age before moving into property management with LJ Hooker Real Estate. At 30 years of age, Evans was appointed Regional General Manager of an outdoor advertising manufacturing company (a subsidiary of the Griffin Group), before being promoted and relocating to their head office in Sydney, New South Wales. In 1989, demands of a young family facilitated a move back to Perth, where he established a highly successful management consultancy specialising in productivity training, and workplace health and safety investigations. During his time in Perth, Evans was highly active with state and national industry groups and was a Councilor of the Western Australian Chamber of Commerce.

In 2002, Evans was appointed Executive Director of the Franchise Council of Australia and helped reshape the governance and compliance practices of this highly regulated sector. In 2007 he was appointed the Executive Director of the Australian Retailers Association. He has also served as Executive Director of the Council of Textile and Fashion Industries Australia  and Clubs Victoria. In these roles, he represented these organisations at productivity commission hearings, various government task forces and consultations, regulatory body advisory groups, industry forums and legislative advisory boards. He has presented at many national and international universities on business, advocacy, and political practices in regulated industries.

Evans also represented Australia on a number of international industry bodies, trade delegations, and was a regular presenter at international industry expos and conferences. He served as the Communications Director on the World Franchise Council, Education Director with the Asia Pacific Franchise Confederation, and was appointed as the Australian franchise sector representative on the government Joint Trade Committee with Malaysia.

Evans continues to serve, and consult to, peak industry associations and not-for-profit organisations. He is the founder and senior partner of the MALThouse Group, a firm providing strategic, governance, and advocacy services to member-based organisations. He is the creator of the AMENO Principle, a model for increasing an organisation's reputation and relevance, and the small business coaching program Latte Leadership

He is often engaged as a key note speaker on business strategy, leadership, and political advocacy.

Politics 
Evans entered politics with clear intentions to make a difference in policy areas he specialised – small business, industry representation, and community relations.

He was nominated for pre-selection to stand as the Liberal Party representative in the 1993 election for the federal Western Australian seat of Cowan. He won the seat, being the first Liberal candidate to do so. In 1993, Evans was an opposition backbencher when the Australian Labor Party was in government, led by Prime Minister, Paul Keating. In his first term as a backbencher, Evans raised policy issues including breast cancer research funding, improved environment awareness for natural fauna, and worked with Indigenous policy.

He was reelected in 1996, with the Liberal Party winning majority and forming government under Prime Minister John Howard. In his second term, Evans gained international recognition for his stance on feral cat management, raised awareness on the need to rethink disability policy, and gained recognition for bringing improved constituent management practices to politicians.

He was a member of a parliamentary inquiry into franchise business practices and regulations which lead to significant changes to Australian trade practice legislation that introduced the world first mandatory Code of Conduct for Franchising.

He won high praise for his work in the environment, specifically protecting native fauna from feral cats which led, in time, with the implementation of a coordinated national approach to ethically managing feral cats in 2014.

Evans stood for reelection in 1998 but lost his seat to a high-profile former state parliament minister.

Political parody 
In popular culture, Evans’ political career and stance on key issues has been parodied by actor Eric Bana in a segment from Australian comedy show 'Full Frontal' (October 1996) and he was included in a 2013 segment by John Oliver on 'The Daily Show with Jon Stewart' on gun control in the U.S. versus Australia.

Author 
Evans was first encouraged to write on a visit to the Republican Convention in San Diego in 1996, when he met Norman Mailer at Dobson's Bar.

All of Evans’ political thrillers are set in and around the workings of the national Commonwealth Parliament of Australia. Evans brings his unique insider view of not only how the Australian political system operates, the untold stories of power and manipulation of perceptions, but also provides a visual on the physical environment of Australia's Parliament House. Politics, as a genre, provides a rich tapestry of characters all working their self-interest and power and with contemporary and historical consequences of their actions.

The Democracy Trilogy 
Evans took three years to complete the first book of his Australian political thriller series – The Democracy Trilogy. The trilogy, told in three episodes, is a snap shot over three years of power and how its misuse corrupts even the most ethical.

Book one, Deceit (2018) begins with a plane crash that starts a sequence of events which leads corrupt Prime Minister Andrew Gerrard to rush through legislation designed to secure his ill-gotten gains after a long political career. Stalwart – and soon to be retired – Clerk of the Commonwealth Parliament, Gordon O’Brien, reluctantly sets out to foil the Prime Minister's plan with the help of an investigative journalist.

Deceit will be published in July 2018 by Sydney-based independent publisher Ventura Press’ imprint Impact Press.

Before Evans completed Deceit, he began work on episode two of the Democracy Trilogy, Duplicity (2019), The sequel centres on an unexpected national election, encouraged by a business group who appoint a covert campaign operative to manipulate the election result and ensure the Prime Minister Gerrard is defeated.

The Referendum Series 
Also in production is the Referendum Series where each book focuses on an issue confounding the Australian public which is sent to referendum, to approve amending, or not, Australia's Constitution.  

Book one of this series, Forgotten People (2020) has Indigenous leader Nellie Millergoorra fight for Australia's improved treatment and engagement with the world's longest continuing culture.

The second book – The Kill Bill (forthcoming, 2021) – is on the federal government's referendum bill to legalise euthanasia, the separation of Church and State, and the personal conflict faced by the Attorney General in response to his daughter's recent coma.

Jack Hudson Series 
The Jack Hudson Series provides a first-person view about the daily personal struggles of a federal minister in the Australian parliament. The series is a semi-autobiographical account based on the challenges Evans faced in his political career and advocacy experience.

Book one of the series Selfish Ambitions (forthcoming, 2022) has federal Minister of Industry Jack Hudson resisting the demands of his Prime Minister and the ever-increasing angst of his career leading him to make a decision which will change everything.

The second book is Horrible People (forthcoming, 2022) where Jack Hudson becomes embroiled in an international diplomatic incident whilst holidaying with his family overseas.

Other publications 
Evans completed his first manuscript, Out of my Hands (unpublished, 1999). The story addressed the issue of rape, murder, capital punishment and the failings of a legal system that condemns an innocent man.

His first published business publication is the high selling Australian Franchising Handbook (Wrightbooks, 2006), a practical pre-entry education guide for prospective franchise business owners. It was a timely publication, reinforcing compliance requirements and standards expected of franchisors and service providers.

Education 
In 2005 he graduated Bachelor of Arts (majoring in industrial relations and English), from The University of Western Australia and in 2012 graduated Masters of Creative Writing from the University of Canberra. He also completed a diploma of business and is a certified mediator.

Personal life 
Evans married Dr. Julia Camm on 2 October 2010. The couple live in the historic bayside village of Williamstown, a suburb of Melbourne, Victoria.

Evans has three children from a previous marriage.

References

1953 births
Living people
Liberal Party of Australia members of the Parliament of Australia
Members of the Australian House of Representatives
Members of the Australian House of Representatives for Cowan
20th-century Australian politicians
20th-century Australian businesspeople
21st-century Australian writers
Australian novelists
Businesspeople from Melbourne
Politicians from Melbourne
Writers from Melbourne
People from Williamstown, Victoria
University of Western Australia alumni
University of Canberra alumni
Politicians from Perth, Western Australia
Australian rules footballers from Melbourne
Subiaco Football Club players
Williamstown Football Club players